Os Amigos was a Portuguese band from the seventies.

The band members were Fernanda Piçarra, Luísa Basto, Edmundo Silva, Ana Bola, Fernando Tordo and Paulo de Carvalho. Tordo represented Portugal in the Eurovision Song Contest 1973 where he reached the 10th place while de Carvalho represented Portugal one year later and reached the 14th place. Ana Bola would go on to be a backing singer for Carlos Paiao at the 1981 Eurovision Song Contest with the song "Playback"

With the song Portugal no coração they won the Portuguese national final in 1977 and went on to represent the country in the Eurovision Song Contest where they reached the 14th place. In the national final every song was sung by two performers, the public chose Os Amigos over Gemini who went on to represent the country in 1978.

Eurovision Song Contest entrants for Portugal
Eurovision Song Contest entrants of 1977
Portuguese pop music groups